Clubul Sportiv Sporting Roșiori de Vede, commonly known as Sporting Roșiori de Vede or simply as Sporting Roșiori is a Romanian professional football club based in Roșiorii de Vede, Teleorman County, and is the unofficial successor of former team Rova Roșiori (dissolved in 2008).

History

County Leagues (2008–2014)
In their first season they take a place in the 2008–09 Liga IV – Teleorman County from Real Beuca and finished on the third place. Next two years they finished fourth. In the 2012–13 season finished first and win the county championship for the first time and qualified in the play-off promotion to Liga III where they failed to promote but they also win the Teleorman County Round of the Cupa României. Next year they reached again the first place and this time they won the qualification play-off and promoted for the first time ever in Liga III.

Liga III (2014–present)
In their first season (2014–15) in the third league of Romanian football they finished fifth.

Honours

Domestic

Leagues
Liga IV – Teleorman County
Winners (2): 2012–13, 2013–14

Cups
Cupa României – Teleorman County
Winners (1): 2012–13

Players

First-team squad

Out on loan

Club officials

Board of directors

Current technical staff

League history

References

External links

Association football clubs established in 2008
Football clubs in Teleorman County
Liga III clubs
Liga IV clubs
2008 establishments in Romania
Roșiorii de Vede